Microceratus (meaning "small-horned") is a genus of small ceratopsian dinosaur that lived in the Cretaceous period in Asia. It was one of the first ceratopsians, or horned dinosaurs, along with Psittacosaurus in Mongolia.

Discovery
The type species, Microceratops gobiensis, was first described by Bohlin in 1953, and so was the second species, M. sulcidens, which may belong to Asiaceratops instead. However, the generic name was already preoccupied by an ichneumon wasp (subfamily Cryptinae) with the same name. Though much of the material has since been reassigned to the genus Graciliceratops, a replacement name Microceratus was created by Mateus in 2008 for the type specimen.

Classification
Microceratus belonged to the Ceratopsia (Ancient Greek for "horned face"), a group of herbivorous dinosaurs with parrot-like beaks which thrived in North America and Asia during the Cretaceous Period, which ended roughly 66 million years ago. All ceratopsians became extinct at the end of this era.

Diet
Microceratus, like all ceratopsians, was a herbivore. During the Cretaceous, flowering plants were "geographically limited on the landscape", and so it is likely that this dinosaur fed on the predominant plants of the era: ferns, cycads and conifers. It would have used its sharp ceratopsian beak to bite off the leaves or needles.

See also
 Timeline of ceratopsian research

 Leptoceratops
 Graciliceratops

References

Neoceratopsians
Late Cretaceous dinosaurs of Asia
Fossil taxa described in 2008
Taxa named by Octávio Mateus
Ornithischian genera